P58  may refer to:
 Feinwerkbau P58, an air pistol
 , a submarine of the Royal Navy
 , a patrol vessel of the Indian Navy
 Lockheed XP-58 Chain Lightning, an American prototype heavy fighter
 Papyrus 58, a biblical manuscript
 P58, a state regional road in Latvia